The initials SLG or S.L.G. may refer to:

 Sigma Lambda Gamma (ΣΛΓ), sorority
 Simulated life game, a type of video game
 Sindicato Labrego Galego-Comisións Labregas, Galician peasants union
 Slave Labor Graphics, comic book publisher
 Slugging percentage, baseball statistic
 Socialist Labour Group, Former UK party
 Proto SLG, paintball marker manufactured
 SL Green Realty Corp (NYSE symbol:SLG)
 Community of the Sisters of the Love of God, post-nominal letters
 Scary Little Girls, a theatrical collective
 Secretary to the local government